Limonest is a commune in the Metropolis of Lyon in Auvergne-Rhône-Alpes region in eastern France.

Geography 
Its people are known as the Limonois.

See also
Communes of the Metropolis of Lyon

References

Communes of Lyon Metropolis
Lyonnais